Tilak Nagar is a railway station on the Harbour Line of the Mumbai Suburban Railway network. It has two platforms which serves North and South bound railway line. The line North goes to the Chembur Railway Station while the line South goes to Kurla  Railway Station.

References

Railway stations in Mumbai Suburban district
Mumbai Suburban Railway stations
Mumbai CR railway division
Memorials to Bal Gangadhar Tilak